Penny Christine Werthner-Bales (born July 5, 1951 in Ottawa, Ontario) is a retired female track and field athlete, who represented Canada at the 1976 Summer Olympics in the women's 1.500 metres. She claimed the bronze medal in the women's 800 metres event at the 1971 Pan American Games in Cali, Colombia, followed by a bronze in the 1.500 metres in 1979.

Penny Werthner, Dean of Kineisiology at the University of Calgary, is married to John Bales, President of the Coaching Association of Canada.

Werthner is one of Canada's most distinguished consultants in the field of sport psychology and recognized as one of CAAWS Top 20 Most Influential Women in Sport and Physical Activity. She joins us after spending the past 12 years at the University of Ottawa where she was Director and Associate Dean, School of Human Kinetics from 2011–2012.

Having come late in her career to academics, Werthner is a kinesiologist with excellent leadership skills and a perfect match for optimizing the potential in our kinesiology faculty. Her more than 30 years of distinguished experience in sport psychology consulting, sport-related management consulting and program management and academic leadership will help us achieve this goal. An Olympic athlete herself in track and field, she has served as a sport psychology consultant for national and Olympic teams since 1985, including as an advisor to the Canadian Olympic Committee on Sport Psychology for the 2008 Beijing Olympic Team and the 2004 Athens Olympic Team. Werthner will be travelling to the Olympics again this summer, her 8th  Olympics, where she will be working with Canada's canoe/kayak and diving teams.

Werthner earned her BA from McMaster University, and her MA and PhD from the University of Ottawa.

She has written dozens of peer-reviewed papers and parts of books. She serves as a reviewer for various journals, such as Qualitative Research in Sport and Exercise, and Journal of Applied Sport Psychology, and is a member of the editorial board of the Canadian Journal for Women in Coaching. She is the current Chair of the Canadian Sport Psychology Association (CSPA/ACPS), is a member of the International Council for Coach Education, is an advisor to the Coaching Association of Canada Women in Coaching Program and is a learning facilitator for the National Coaching Certificate Program (NCCP).

Penny currently resides in Calgary, Alberta with her husband John Bales, her son Neil Bales and her daughter Elena Bales.

References

 Canadian Olympic Committee

1951 births
Living people
Canadian female middle-distance runners
Athletes (track and field) at the 1970 British Commonwealth Games
Athletes (track and field) at the 1971 Pan American Games
Athletes (track and field) at the 1976 Summer Olympics
Athletes (track and field) at the 1979 Pan American Games
Athletes (track and field) at the 1978 Commonwealth Games
Olympic track and field athletes of Canada
Athletes from Ottawa
Commonwealth Games bronze medallists for Canada
Pan American Games bronze medalists for Canada
Commonwealth Games medallists in athletics
Pan American Games medalists in athletics (track and field)
Medalists at the 1971 Pan American Games
Medalists at the 1979 Pan American Games
Medallists at the 1978 Commonwealth Games